Raissa Gourevitch (born 1 March 1984) is a former Russian tennis player.

In her career, she won twelve doubles titles on the ITF Women's Circuit. On 24 September 2001, she reached her best singles ranking of world No. 396. On 2 February 2004, she peaked at No. 257 in the doubles rankings.

Gourevitch made her WTA main-draw debut at the 2001 Tashkent Open in the doubles event partnering Yuliya Beygelzimer.

She retired from the professional tour in 2010.

ITF finals

Singles: 1 (0–1)

Doubles: 24 (12–12)

References

External links
 
 

1984 births
Living people
Russian female tennis players
20th-century Russian women
21st-century Russian women